Calle Erik Ridderwall (born 28 May 1988) is a Swedish former professional ice hockey winger who most notably played in the Kontinental Hockey League (KHL) and Swedish Hockey League (SHL).

Playing career
Undrafted, Ridderwall played amateur hockey in the United States, before attending and participating in collegiate hockey with the University of Notre Dame in the CCHA. While attending the Mendoza College of Business, Ridderwall played in two Frozen Four championships. In the 2008 Frozen Four, Ridderwall scored the game winning goal in overtime to send the Fighting Irish to the semifinals.

Upon graduating from Notre Dame with a degree in finance, Ridderwall made his professional debut in the American Hockey League with the Providence Bruins.

After a single season within the AHL and without securing a NHL contract, Ridderwall returned to Europe and made his Deutsche Eishockey Liga debut playing with Düsseldorfer EG during the 2012–13 season. Ridderwall enjoyed a largely successful season with DEG, finishing the year with an impressive 22 goals and 58 points in only 51 games to lead the entire DEL in scoring. He was then signed to a lucrative Kontinental Hockey League contract with Czech club, HC Lev Praha on 15 April 2013.

On 8 July 2014, after only signing a two-year contract extension a month earlier but with HC Lev Praha announcing financial bankruptcy, Ridderwall announced his return to Sweden in signing a two-year contract with HV71.

After captaining Djurgårdens IF in his second season with the club in 2017–18, Ridderwall opted to return as a free agent to former German club, Düsseldorfer EG of the DEL, agreeing to a three-year contract on 2 May 2018.

In the 2018–19 season, Ridderwall failed to match his previous offensive contributions from his first stint with Düsseldorfer, however still contributed with 28 points in 52 games. After a first round defeat to Augsburger Panther, Ridderwall at the conclusion of the season requested his contract to be terminated from the remaining two years, in announcing his retirement from professional hockey to take up business opportunities back in the United States.

Personal life
Both Ridderwall's cousin Stefan Ridderwall and his uncle play hockey. Stefan played goaltender for Timrå IK in the Swedish Hockey League and his uncle Rolf Ridderwall won gold at the 1991 Men's World Ice Hockey Championships.

Career statistics

Awards and honors

References

External links

1988 births
Living people
Djurgårdens IF Hockey players
Düsseldorfer EG players
HC Lev Praha players
Notre Dame Fighting Irish men's ice hockey players
Ice hockey people from Stockholm
Providence Bruins players
Swedish ice hockey forwards
Tri-City Storm players
HV71 players
HC Sibir Novosibirsk players
Swedish expatriate ice hockey players in the United States
Swedish expatriate sportspeople in Germany
Swedish expatriate sportspeople in Russia
Swedish expatriate sportspeople in the Czech Republic
Expatriate ice hockey players in the United States
Expatriate ice hockey players in Germany
Expatriate ice hockey players in Russia
Expatriate ice hockey players in the Czech Republic